Ludwig Scholz (30 June 1937 in Juliusberg, Landkreis Oels, Lower Silesia, now Dobroszyce, Oleśnica County, Poland – 20 September 2005 in Nuremberg, Bavaria) was a German politician of the CSU and the mayor of Nuremberg.

Politics 
Ludwig Scholz was the surprise winner of the Nuremberg municipal elections in 1996. He became successor of the longtime mayor Peter Schönlein, but lost the next elections in 2002 to Ulrich Maly.

Scholz was the first Catholic mayor of Nuremberg since the Reformation.

References

1937 births
2005 deaths
Mayors of Nuremberg
German Roman Catholics